13cabs is an Australian taxi network with a fleet of over 10,000 vehicles. Named after their phone number (13 2227 or “13cabs”), and a part of A2B Australia, 13cabs operates in Sydney, Melbourne, Adelaide, Brisbane and Newcastle. 13cabs has expanded to the Northern Territory, regional Victoria and regional Queensland, providing a 24/7 booking service via three Australian-based contact centres.

13things
In March 2020, in an effort to counter the impact of the COVID-19 pandemic on the taxi industry, it was announced that 13cabs had established a subsidiary named 13things, a home delivery service that offers to pick up and deliver goods and parcels.

Bookings can be made through the 13cabs app, enabling users to book a taxi as they would if they were travelling. They then fill in an option to mark it as a parcel.

Community
13cabs supports and creates community programs such as the 13cabs Taxi Driver Memorial Cup, an annual cricket match between a team of taxi drivers and a team of professional athletes. In 2019, they facilitated over 8 million trips supporting passengers with a disability. Other initiatives include helping to deliver medical goods to hospitals, partnering with charitable organisations like Guide Dogs Australia, the Royal Children's Hospital and the Good Friday Appeal.

Locations
13cabs operates in all states and territories of Australia 
Adelaide
Brisbane
Darwin
Melbourne
Perth
Sydney
Airlie Beach
Alice Springs
Albury
Bairnsdale
Ballarat
Bendigo
Blue Mountains
Bundaberg
Coffs Harbour
Dubbo
Darwin
Forster
Gold Coast
Geelong
Geraldton
Ipswich
Logan
Mackay
Mandurah
Newcastle
Rockhampton
Sale
Shepparton
Surf Coast
Tamworth
Taree
Toowoomba
Townsville
Tully
Tuncurry
Warrnambool
Wellington
Wodonga
Wollongong

Awards
On 25 July 2014, 13cabs was awarded the Monash Business Awards Business of the Year 2013–2014.

References

Companies based in Melbourne
Taxis of Australia